Sylvia Bossu (20 June 1962 – 15 July 1995) was a French conceptual artist. After exhibiting her works in Paris, Antwerp, Vienna, Munich or Berlin in the early 1990s, Bossu died prematurely in a car accident in 1995, aged 33.

Biography

Early life and education 
Sylvia Bossu was born on 20 June 1962 in Saint-Rémy, Bourgogne, to Émile Bossu (1934–1996) and Angélique née Dedieu (born 1934). She was the sixth child of a family of ten. Her father was a plasterer and house painter. She attended the lycée Pontus de Tyard in Chalon-sur-Saône, and dropped at 16 to enter the École Municipale de Dessin ("Municipal school of drawings") of Chalon-sur-Saône in 1979.

In September 1981, Bossu entered the École des Beaux-Arts of Dijon, where she met the Chinese painter Yan Pei-Ming and the French painter and visual artist Cécile Bart. In January 1982, Bossu started a relationship with Éric Colliard, with whom she had a son, Adrien, born in 1993.

Career 
Bossu had her first solo exhibition in October 1987. In January–February 1988 she presented the work Alimentation T 2 and, in November–December, Miroir de courtoisie 1. Bossu then worked in Sète, south of France, in 1989 and in 1990.

In 1991–1992, Bossu went back to Paris and was the artist in residence at the studios of the American Center in the Cité des Arts, where she met American artist Claudia Hart.

In the early 1990s, Bossu exhibited her works in Paris (MAM; January 1992), Antwerp (M KHA; February 1992), Vienna, Munich or Berlin. In 1993 she moved to Berlin, where she lived with Hart, and frequently travelled between Paris, Berlin, Antwerp and Vienna. In August 1994 she moved to Paris to live with Éric Colliard.

Bossu died in a car accident in Chamousset, Savoie, on 15 July 1995, aged 33, while heading to the Festival d'Avignon. In 2006 she was posthumously awarded the Prix Évelyne Encelot Femmes & Art.

Works 
Bossu belongs to a movement that art critic Nicolas Bourriaud has called the esthétique du relationnel ('aesthetics of the relational'). In the magazine art press, Claudia Hart described Bossu's works as an existential search for the "raw, naked expression of human pain", breaking with the approach of "her master Marcel Duchamp." Bossu animated her ready-mades, Hart follows, "by borrowing her machines from the everyday world – a sewing machine or a bathroom scale – and placing them in tautological arrangements that became metaphors of alienation, separation or death."

In Miroir de courtoisie 1 (1988) the spectator is invited to stand up in front of a mirror in order to look at their reflection. As the spectator walks towards the mirror, however, a photo-electric cell triggers the flash of a camera that saturates the mirror. The spectator, dazzled, is unable to see their reflection.

In Films cousus (1992) the projector produces the sound of a sewing machine as a film is projected, giving the impression that the projector is sewing the film in front of the spectator.

In La mangeuse d'images (1992) the spectator is invited to see his personal films one last time, then destroy them by offering them to a shredder.

Au moment voulu (1995) takes the form of a meat grinder connected to a scale, so that the grinder cuts raw meat when a person steps on the scale. The title is inspired by Maurice Blanchot's novel Au moment voulu, where the narrator describes a situation in which he feels the existence of a will that goes beyond him and encompasses him.

References

Bibliography

Further reading

External links 
 English translation of the chapter "Sylvia Bossu" written by art critic Élisabeth Lebovici in Le Dictionnaire universel des créatrices (2015). Archive.

1962 births
French conceptual artists
1995 deaths